Denis Brian (11 December 1923 – 30 May 2017) was a Welsh journalist and writer, notable for writing the 1996 biography Einstein: A Life.

Brian was born in Cardiff on 11 December 1923. He graduated from Ravensbourne School, Bromley in 1939 and then worked as a reporter for the Irish News Service in Fleet Street for two years. Upon reaching the age of eighteen, he joined the Royal Air Force; after two years' training (mostly in Canada) he became a Lancaster bomber pilot with the rank of flight lieutenant. He flew 36 missions and was awarded the DFC. After WWII he studied playwriting at the Royal Academy of Dramatic Art and several of his plays were produced in English theatres. In 1957 Brian emigrated to the United States, where he worked as a freelance writer and editor for several publications, including the Writer's Literary Agency. In the early 1960s he began writing books. His novel The love-minded received favourable reviews. In the 1970s he moved to West Palm Beach.

Brian died in Washington, D.C., on 30 May 2017, at the age of 93.

Selected works

 2nd edition, 1980

References

External links
Denis Brian the Author, blogspot.com

1923 births
2017 deaths
British biographers
British non-fiction writers
British male writers
Male non-fiction writers
Royal Air Force pilots of World War II
British World War II bomber pilots
Writers from Cardiff
Recipients of the Distinguished Flying Cross (United Kingdom)